Pink (stylized PINK) is a lingerie and apparel line by Victoria's Secret, a former subsidiary of L Brands, targeting younger women than their main line. The target demographic consists of youth from ages 13 to 22.  PINK had a regular segment featuring their products in the Victoria's Secret Fashion Show, held through 2018.  Sales at the company were initially swift, reaching $1 billion in 2010.  Reports of decline due to shifting consumer preferences appeared in 2018.

History

On October 16, 2002, Victoria's Secret announced the launch of PINK, a new sub-brand and product line. While originally aimed at "tween" girls ages 10–12, the brand would eventually state its official target demographic is teen girls and college-age women. The product first appeared in late 2003 in select stores, with a full chain-wide roll out in July 2004. The company often placed its stores side-by-side with Victoria's Secret stores.

The PINK brand sells underwear, swimsuits, sleepwear, loungewear, beauty products, and accessories. The brand was launched strategically, to increase and preserve future Victoria's Secret customers (i.e, ages 21+) and market share by building an expanded pipeline of customers whose brand awareness and loyalty are established and cemented up to 10 years earlier, as tweens and teens.

Pink's competition in the lingerie market for the youth demographic includes Abercrombie & Fitch  and Aerie by American Eagle.  The company's pajamas and sweat pants proved popular within the teenage and preteen set from 2006.

The company grew rapidly in the 2000s, adding stores domestically, and by 2010, sales at PINK reached $1 billion.  On November 1, 2009, PINK established its first stand-alone store in Canada, prior to the main Victoria's Secret brand opening its first Canadian store on August 12, 2010.

After working as a leading executive at L Brands and Bath and Body Works, Richard Dent joined the management team at PINK in 2005.  He held several key leadership roles at PINK, including the jointly-held responsibilities of COO, SVP, and co-leader of the division.  Under Dent's leadership, the brand established a partnership with the National Football League (NFL), Major League Baseball (MLB) and the Collegiate Licensing Company for use of the names and logos of 60 universities in a line of PINK clothing.  The Pink "Collegiate Collection" was released in July 2008.  Dent expanded the company’s college line in 2009 to include historically black colleges and universities (HBCUs), in response to a campaign by a student at Howard University.

Denise Landman was appointed CEO at PINK in 2011 and served until she retired at the end of 2018. Landman was succeeded by Amy Hauk as CEO in 2019.

The PINK line has been promoted through college tours, and in 2011, the brand continued to work in partnership with NFL teams to market apparel containing team logos to teenage girls and college-aged women.

Reports of declining sales at PINK began to appear in 2018, following shifts in consumer preferences towards athleisure and a move towards more body-positive brands of underwear than parent brand Victoria's Secret.  Analysts have regarded PINK as more nimble, with a better track record of shifting their marketing towards inclusivity, than their parent brand, which faced an onslaught of controversy in 2019 and 2020.   As of 2020, the company had 141 stores, all attached to Victoria's Secret stores.

Controversy
In March 2013, Victoria's Secret PINK launched a marketing campaign for its "Bright Young Things" underwear line, directed at teen and pre-teen girls, that drew considerable negative attention. The underwear contained wording such as "call me", "feeling lucky", and "wild". A Change.org petition calling for the company to discontinue its product line amassed over 24,000 subscribers. After the criticism increased, Victoria's Secret removed the items from the company's website and said that the ad campaign was meant for college-age women.

Kylie Bisutti, a former Victoria's Secret model, headlined several Pink to Purpose events from 2013 to 2015, and since 2018. These events, unrelated to the retailer, are described as an encouragement for women "to leave the PINK lifestyle to find PURPOSE!" Bisutti perceives her past as "being at the pinnacle of the PINK lifestyle of fake, broken relationships".

PINK was central to the controversy around longtime L Brands Chief Marketing Officer Ed Razek's 2018 interview with Vogue, in which he spoke out against the inclusion of plus-size and trans models in the Victoria's Secret Fashion Show specifically, and the Victoria's Secret business model, generally.  In August 2019, the first openly transgender model, Valentina Sampaio, was hired to work for PINK; Razek's resignation was announced just days later.

Marketing

PINK is a division of Victoria's Secret, and was owned by American retail company L Brands. Victoria's Secret was a subsidiary of L Brands, with financials for PINK reported jointly with those of Victoria's Secret.

In a 2009 letter to shareholders, the company's founder, Les Wexner, stated in that PINK had "brought vitality, youth, energy, and an all-new customer base to base Victoria's Secret."

Spokesmodels 
The PINK brand has its own spokesmodels that serve as brand ambassadors.  Zuri Tibby became the brand's first spokesmodel of color in 2016.

PINK has a college line that focuses brand recognition through public university athletics, started in 2008 under the leadership of Richard Dent.

The company has partnered with both MLB and the NFL for lines launched by Prinsloo as well as then Angels Chanel Iman, Erin Heatherton, and Candice Swanepoel. Since then, spokesmodels, including Hosk and Jessica Hart, have attended sporting events to promote joint ventures with MLB and the NFL.

Starting in 2010, the brand marketed their product line at spring break parties, often hosted by a pair of female models (including Behati Prinsloo, Chanel Iman, Elsa Hosk, Rachel Hilbert, Sara Sampaio, and Devon Windsor) and a male guest such as Alexander Ludwig, Nick Jonas, Cody Simpson, or Diego Boneta

The brand, via a "PINK Nation" campaign, has also promoted their products with campus bashes featuring popular performers, as in 2014 with Iggy Azalea at University of Nevada Las Vegas.

Additional models appeared at events for the brand, including Taylor Marie Hill, Emily Didonato, and Jessica Strother as well as the celebrity Ashlee Simpson.

Victoria's Secret Fashion Show

There has been segment for PINK in the annual Victoria's Secret Fashion Show from 2006 to 2018, the final year the show was held.

In 2007, the brand held an event featuring spokesmodel Miranda Kerr, alongside Jessica Stam and Rosie Huntington-Whiteley. The company ran a contest called "Pink Road Trip to the Runway", awarding a spot in the 2007 fashion show to winner, Katie Wile.

The Fashion Show runway segment for PINK was initially accompanied by recorded music from popular artists. From 2010 through 2018, the PINK runway segment featured live performances by widely recognized music acts.  Katy Perry was the first live performer for the PINK runway at Victoria's Secret Fashion Show 2010, performing a medley from her recently released Teenage Dream album, in addition to performing "Firework" in a segment for the main Victoria's Secret brand.

In 2012, Justin Bieber performed during the Pink segment of the fashion show, while the notorious bicycle corset, featuring only handlebars with streamers, was modeled by Jessica Hart.

PINK has also marketed their brand by sponsoring fashion show viewing parties during air time, such as in 2013 at West Virginia University.

Pink runway history

Notes

References

External links

Victoria's Secret
Swimwear brands
Products introduced in 2002
2000s fashion
2010s fashion
Companies based in the Columbus, Ohio metropolitan area
Lingerie brands